

List of Ministers of Town and Country Town and Public Works (1977-2010)

List of Ministers of Planning and Sustainability (since 2010)

External links
 Official site of the Ministry of Town and Country Town and Public Works

Territory and Sustainability